Aegean Macedonia is a term describing the modern Greek region of Macedonia in Northern Greece. It is currently mainly used in the Republic of North Macedonia, including in the irredentist context of a United Macedonia. The term is also used in Bulgaria as the more common synonym for Greek Macedonia, without the connotations it has in the Republic of North Macedonia. The term has no circulation in Greece, since Aegean usually refers to the Greek islands or to strictly Greek coastal areas with direct access to the Aegean Sea. Although Greek Macedonia does have its coastline along the northern Aegean, the province is more than anything else dominated by its high mountain ranges and broad, grassy plains, rather than by its coastline (with the exception of the Chalkidiki peninsula, which is a popular holiday destination in the southernmost part of central Macedonia and noted for its beaches).

Origins of the term

The origins of the term seem to be rooted in the 1910s; most of its early appearances were in the writings of Bulgarian authors. Since the mid-1940s the term has appeared on maps circulated first in Yugoslavia and especially after 1991 in the independent Republic of North Macedonia which envisioned Greek Macedonia (referred to as "Aegean Macedonia") as part of a "Greater Macedonia", and is regarded as a non-recognition of current European borders, including the legitimacy of Greek sovereignty over the area. 

During the Greek Civil War, the Greek government referred to the usage as a "new term" only recently introduced by Josip Broz Tito in Yugoslavia, implying that it considered it part of the Yugoslav campaign of laying claim to Greek Macedonia.

Tito's war-time representative to Yugoslav Macedonia, Svetozar Vukmanović-Tempo, is credited with promoting the usage of the regional names of the Macedonian region for irredentist purposes. On August 26, 1946, the Belgrade newspaper Borba published an article under the title "Aegean Macedonia", it was also published in Skopje's  with a map of Yugoslav territorial claims against Greece. Vlahov then went on to publish, "The Problems of Aegean Macedonia", Belgrade, June 1947.

Post-WWII

By 1950, the term 'Aegean Macedonians' had been officially adopted by the Macedonian refugees in Skopje who began publishing the newspaper The Voice of the Aegeans; it is later found amongst diaspora communities.

In Greece, the Slavic speakers of Greek Macedonia, were acknowledged as Slavomacedonians. A native of the region, former exile communist, teacher of Greek in Tashkent and local historian, Pavlos Koufis, says in Laografika Florinas kai Kastorias (Folklore of Florina and Kastoria), that, 
“[During its Panhellenic Meeting in September 1942, the KKE mentioned that it recognises the equality of the ethnic minorities in Greece] the KKE (Communist Party of Greece) recognised that the Slavophone population was ethnic minority of Slavomacedonians]. This was a term, which the inhabitants of the region accepted with relief. [Because] Slavomacedonians = Slavs+Macedoninas. The first section of the term determined their origin and classified them in the great family of the Slavic peoples.”

The name "Aegean Macedonia" contains on the one hand a reference to a geographical area which, since Homeric times, is historically associated with the Greeks (the Aegean), but, as expressed above, there is also the experience that it is used by irredentist organizations in the Republic of North Macedonia and beyond who support a United Macedonia, contrary to the desires of the people living in the area.
 
Writing in 1953, Lazar Mojsov seems surprised that the Greeks find the term "Aegean Macedonia" insulting, and uses it frequently, noting that "...Politis (former Greek minister of external affairs) didn't miss the opportunity to attack even the very term "Aegean Macedonia", stating that it was "coined by the communist propagandists".

The term is currently used by some scholars, mostly contextualised, along with the sister terms Vardar Macedonia (describing the part of Macedonia region in which the Republic of North Macedonia inhabits) and Pirin Macedonia (describing the part of Macedonia region in which the Blagoevgrad Province of Bulgaria inhabits). The area of the Macedonian region that is part of Albania and Kosovo is often excluded. The term is used more frequently by ethnic Macedonians and has irredentist connotations.

See also

Slavic speakers of Greek Macedonia
Macedonian nationalism
Belomorie

References

Modern history of Greek Macedonia
Macedonian nationalism